Florian Schwarthoff (born May 7, 1968 in Dortmund) is a former German hurdler best known for winning a bronze medal at the 1996 Summer Olympics. Schwarthoff had his best season in 1995 when set a new German record of 13.05 sec. in Bremen. He was expected to compete for a silver or bronze medal at the World Championships in Gothenburg behind the overwhelming favourite Allen Johnson from the United States. However, Schwarthoff did not finish the semi-final as he fell over a hurdle. Schwarthoff remained for several years a world class hurdler but never won a gold medal.

Personal bests
100 metres - 10.57 (1996)
200 metres - 20.86 (1991)
110 metres hurdles - 13.05 (1995) - German record
Long jump - 7.69 (1986)

Achievements

References

External links
 
 
 

1968 births
Living people
German male hurdlers
Athletes (track and field) at the 1988 Summer Olympics
Athletes (track and field) at the 1992 Summer Olympics
Athletes (track and field) at the 1996 Summer Olympics
Athletes (track and field) at the 2000 Summer Olympics
Olympic athletes of Germany
Olympic athletes of West Germany
Olympic bronze medalists for Germany
Sportspeople from Dortmund
European Athletics Championships medalists
Medalists at the 1996 Summer Olympics
Olympic bronze medalists in athletics (track and field)
Universiade medalists in athletics (track and field)
World Athletics Championships athletes for West Germany
World Athletics Championships athletes for Germany
Universiade bronze medalists for West Germany
Medalists at the 1989 Summer Universiade